Catastrophe: How Obama, Congress, and the Special Interests Are Transforming a Slump into a Crash, Freedom into Socialism, and a Disaster into a Catastrophe . . . and How to Fight Back is a 2009 book co-written by American political commentator Dick Morris and his wife Eileen McGann, which spells out hypothetical catastrophic consequences of the Barack Obama administration policies and shows how the Obama administration could be stopped.

Reception
Catastrophe was number 1 on The New York Times Best Seller list for the first two weeks after its release, and was third in the July 2009 Poli-Book Best Seller List.  It ranked number 6 in non-fiction on The Wall Street Journals July Best Sellers listing.

Dana Larsen of Storm Lake Pilot Tribune writes that in the book, Morris accuses the Obama administration of "canceling the war on terror and replacing it with a war on prosperity".  Larsen expands that Morris feels the administration's takeover of both banks and the auto industries, its compromising of the existing health care systems, its "enfranchising" of illegal aliens, and its relinquishing of personal liberties is creating a socialist state.

References

External links
Book: Obama turning slump into socialism

2009 non-fiction books
Books about Barack Obama
HarperCollins books